Alice, Darling is a 2022 psychological thriller film directed by Mary Nighy, in her directorial debut, from a screenplay by Alanna Francis. The film stars Anna Kendrick, Kaniehtiio Horn, Charlie Carrick, and Wunmi Mosaku.

Alice, Darling had its world premiere at the Toronto International Film Festival on September 11, 2022, and was released in select cinemas on December 30, 2022, in Los Angeles at the AMC Sunset 5, before a wide release later in the United States on January 20, 2023, exclusively in AMC Theatres.

Plot
Alice (Anna Kendrick) is in a psychologically abusive relationship with her boyfriend, Simon (Charlie Carrick). After taking a vacation with friends, she decides to reassess her relationship with Simon and attempts to break her codependency.

Simon allows Alice out for a rare evening at a bar with her two best friends Tess (Kaniehtiio Horn) and Sophie (Wunmi Mosaku). The women notice that she is distracted and flinches at each ping from her phone, and throughout the evening she constantly touches her hair. It is implied that Alice met Simon in Tess's circle. However, despite Simon's connection to Tess, he seems to be removing her from her friends. Sophie proposes that they should celebrate Tess’ birthday at her parents' house up north, which Alice readily agrees to. Rather than tell Simon the truth, she informs him it is a work trip to Minneapolis.

On the trip to the cottage, the trio makes a quick stop at a convenience store, where Alice spots a flyer for a missing girl, Andrea. The missing person case seems to consume Alice.

The three women spend time together at the cottage, the rural town and a lake near the cottage. Simon discovers where they are from Tess's Instagram posts and calls Alice, demanding she leave and return to him. Alice packs up but Tess hides her phone and wallet, while Sophie goes to the store as an excuse for Tess and Alice to spend time together. Tess tries to teach Alice to paddle board on the lake. She jokingly rocks the board thus Alice falls off and loses her earring, a gift from Simon. Alice in a panic dives down to find the earring. Unsuccessful, she returns to the shore where she suffers further panic attacks muttering the phrase that she "can't do another thing wrong". When pressed by Tess they have an argument and Alice confesses that she hid their  vacation retreat from Simon. Tess immediately questions Alice's well-being. Alice cancels her plan to leave and the next morning she joins the search party for Andrea. Somewhere near an abandoned cottage she finds lipstick and thinks it belongs to Andrea.

Back in the cottage, the women repair their friendship and have a good time. Alice starts opening up to her friends, even at one point telling them that Simon never hurt her physically but eventually admitting Simon subjected her to emotional abuse. Alice stops responding to Simon's messages, leading him to show up unannounced with grocery bags in hand. That evening at a very tense dinner, Simon pulls out a newspaper showing the news that the body of the missing girl was finally found. Alice takes out the lipstick and says what she thinks about it. Simon condescendingly attempts to shut her down.

The next morning, Alice packs and leaves the cottage, surprising her friends. On the way to the main road, Simon stops his car at a junction allowing a long line of cyclists to pass. Sophie catches up with the car and breaks the back windshield using a maul. Alice gets out and locks eyes with Sophie, signalling to her friend that she doesn't want to go with Simon. Simon meanwhile demands for Alice to get back into the car, but she firmly  declines. Tess steps in between Simon and Alice forcing Simon to give up. He walks back to the car and aggressively throws Alice's possessions out before driving away.

The film concludes with Alice riding the paddle board and taking a dive into the lake.

Cast
 Anna Kendrick as Alice
 Kaniehtiio Horn as Tess
 Charlie Carrick as Simon
 Wunmi Mosaku as Sophie
 Mark Winnick as Marcus
 Carolyn Fe as Customer

Production
In July 2021, it was announced Anna Kendrick, Charlie Carrick, Wunmi Mosaku, and Kaniehtiio Horn would star in the film, with Mary Nighy directing from a screenplay by Alanna Francis, with Elevation Pictures set to distribute domestically in Canada and Lionsgate internationally.

Principal photography took place from June 21 to July 20, 2021, in Toronto. The film doesn't hide the story location is set in Toronto and surrounding area, with location name and landmark appear clearly in the film.

Release
The film was released in a limited capacity on December 30, 2022, in Los Angeles at the AMC Sunset 5, before having a wide release on January 20, 2023, exclusively in AMC Theatres. It had its world premiere at the 2022 Toronto International Film Festival on September 11, 2022.

The film was released for VOD on February 3, 2023. It will be released for Blu-ray and DVD on March 14, 2023.

Reception

References

External links
 

2022 films
2022 independent films
American psychological thriller films
Canadian psychological thriller films
English-language Canadian films
Films shot in Toronto
Lionsgate films
2020s Canadian films
2020s American films
2020s psychological thriller films
Films about abuse
2020s English-language films